La Degustation Bohême Bourgeoise is a restaurant in Prague, Czech Republic, located on Haštalská Street. The restaurant offers three menus: Czech traditional, Czech-inspired fusion, and pan-European, which can be combined. 

In 2009, it was named as the best restaurant in the Czech Republic, and received the Grand Restaurant 2010 award, presented annually by the Czech Association of Restaurateurs. The restaurant was awarded with a Michelin star in 2012. 

Forbes Life called it the "first choice for its buckle-in, three-hour seven-course tasting menus (plus a blizzard of Amuse-bouches)."

References

https://www.viamichelin.com/web/Restaurant/Praha-110_00-La_Degustation_Boheme_Bourgeoise-205770-41102

External links
La degustation website

Czech restaurants
Restaurants in Prague
European restaurants in the Czech Republic